Athar Ali Khan (born 10 February 1962) is a Bangladeshi cricket commentator and former cricketer. Throughout the 1980s, Athar played as a middle order batsman, batting mostly at No. 4 or 5.

Later on, encouraged by the Indian Test Cricketer, Mohinder Amarnath, Atahar started opening regularly for the Bangladesh national cricket team. He was a slow medium pacer taking six wickets in ODI matches. He is an Urdu-speaking Bangladeshi.His ancestors are from Uttar Pradesh now in India.

International career

Early years
In 1984, Atahar played for the Bangladesh Tigers in the first South East Asian Cup. A year later he played in the 3 Day match against Sri Lanka in Dhaka. During the season 1984–85 he was part of the Dhaka University team which won the National cricket title. In the semi-final, against Dhaka district, Atahar scored 155 and shared a record stand of 447 with Tariquzzaman Munir (308).

Prominence
In October 1988, he was Bangladesh's best performer in the Wills Asia Cup at Dhaka. He scored 16 against India, 22 against Pakistan and 30 against Sri Lanka. Then on the final day of 1990, he entertained the huge 50,000-strong crowd at Eden Garden, Calcutta with a score of 78* against Sri Lanka. His innings included three huge sixes. Although Bangladesh lost the match, Atahar was adjudged the Man-of-the-Match.

Atahar's highest ODI score (82) came against Pakistan in 1997. There, he put on a century partnership (110) with skipper Akram Khan (59). He was involved with another century partnership a year later. Against Kenya, he put on 137 for the first wicket with Mohammad Rafiq. Atahar's own contribution was 47. This partnership set up Bangladesh's first ever ODI win. His best bowling in ODI was 2/33 against India at Mohali in 1997. Sourav Ganguly was one of his victims.

Atahar played for Bangladesh in three ICC Trophy tournaments, in England in 1986, in Kenya in 1994 and finally in Malaysia in 1997. He had a disappointing time in England in '86, as he lost his place in the side midway through the trophy, due to lack of form. He had scored only 55 runs from 5 innings. The wet conditions in England did not suit Atahar's batting technique. After being overlooked for the 1990 trophy in Netherlands, Atahar returned for 1994 tournament in Kenya. There also, he failed to live up to the expectations, scoring only 90 runs from 6 innings. However, Atahar played a big part in Bangladesh's success 3 years later. He scored 170 runs from 9 innings, with 2 not outs, as Bangladesh became the unbeaten champion.

Beyond internationals
1988 was a highly successful year for Atahar Ali Khan. First, at the 2nd South East Asian Cup at Hong Kong Athar scored 92 not out against Hong Kong, 69 not out against Singapore in the League matches and followed these with 64 in the final against Hong Kong. He was adjudged the Man-of-the-Match for the final.

Atahar played for Bangladesh in 3 South Asian Association for Regional Cooperation cricket tournaments in Dhaka. He scored 52 against Sri Lanka A in 1994, to set up a win for his team.

Outside cricket
He studied public administration at Dhaka University.

International awards

One Day International Cricket

Man of the Match awards

References

External links
 Athar Ali Khan at CricketArchive
 Athar Ali Khan at Cricinfo

1962 births
Bangladesh One Day International cricketers
Bangladeshi cricketers
Bangladeshi cricket commentators
University of Dhaka alumni
Living people
Bangladeshi cricket coaches
Cricketers from Dhaka
Urdu-speaking Bangladeshi